Thomas Frederick Crapper (4 March 1909 – 12 June 1976) was  a former Australian rules footballer who played with Richmond in the Victorian Football League (VFL).

Notes

External links 

1909 births
1976 deaths
Australian rules footballers from Victoria (Australia)
Richmond Football Club players
Eaglehawk Football Club players